{{DISPLAYTITLE:Theta1 Crucis}}

Theta1 Crucis (θ1 Cru, Theta1 Crucis) is a spectroscopic binary star system in the southern constellation of Crux. It is visible to the naked eye with an apparent visual magnitude of 4.30m. The distance to this star, as determined using parallax measurements, is around 235 light years.

The pair orbit each other closely with a period of 24.5 days and an eccentricity of 0.61. The primary component is an Am star, which is a chemically peculiar A-type star that shows anomalous variations in absorption lines of certain elements. It has a stellar classification of A3(m)A8-A8. With a mass 157% times that of the Sun, it radiates 81 times the Sun's luminosity from its outer atmosphere at an effective temperature of 7341 K. Unusually for a fully radiative A-type star, X-ray emissions have been detected, which may instead be coming from the orbiting companion.

References

A-type main-sequence stars
Crucis, Theta1
Crux (constellation)
Spectroscopic binaries
104671
058758
4599
Durchmusterung objects